Eyn Molla (also Romanized as ‘Eyn Mollā; also known as ‘Eyn Malān) is a village in Kani Bazar Rural District, Khalifan District, Mahabad County, West Azerbaijan Province, Iran. At the 2006 census, its population was 39, in 5 families.

References 

Populated places in Mahabad County